Mother's Finest is the official debut album by Atlanta group Mother's Finest. It was released in 1972 on RCA Records, followed by a single, "You Move Me" b/w "Dear Sir And Brother Mann," but neither the album or single made the Billboard charts. The band was disappointed with the album, claiming that RCA added "instrumental sweetening" without their consent. Despite sessions for a second album, they were later dropped by RCA.

The album was released on CD by Wounded Bird Records in 2010 as part of a two-disc package that also included the band's 1973 unreleased second RCA album, their 1976 Epic Records debut, also titled Mother's Finest, and the single edit of "Thank You for the Love" from their 1977 Epic release, Another Mother Further. Both the vinyl and CD editions are out-of-print.

British label SoulMusic Records included "You Move Me" and "Dear Sir and Brother Mann" from the 1972 debut and "Monster People", "Bone Song", "Living Hero", "Middle of the Night", "Funky Mountain" and "Run Joe" from the unreleased second RCA album on their 2-disc Love Changes: The Anthology 1972 - 1983 set, released in March 2017.

"Doncha Wanna Love Me" and "My Baby", the 2 songs from the second unreleased RCA album left off Love Changes: The Anthology 1972 - 1983, were re-recorded by the band and included on their 1976 eponymous debut album for Epic Records.

Track listing
"Love Is All I Need (It's Too Hard to Carry On)" (Jerry Seay, Joyce Kennedy) - 3:44
"You Move Me" (Glenn Murdock, Mike Keck) - 4:01
"You'll Like It 'Hear'" (Keck) 4:35
"Dear Sir and Brother Mann" (Gary Moore, Murdock) - 3:39
"Feelin' Alright" (Dave Mason) - 4:32
"It's What You Do with What You Got" (Jeff Barry, Bobby Bloom) - 3:38
"Sweeten the Air You Breath" (Keck) - 3:09
"You Make Me Feel So Good" (Murdock, Kennedy) - 4:03
"Love the One You're With" (Stephen Stills) - 3:19

Personnel
Mother's Finest
Joyce "Baby Jean" Kennedy – lead & backing vocals, percussion
Glenn Murdock – lead & backing vocals, percussion
Mike Keck – keyboards, background vocals
Jerry "Wiz" Seay – bass
Gary "Mo" Moore – guitars
Donny Vosburgh - drums

Production
Produced by Hank Medress and Dave Appell
Recorded at Century Sound, New York
Engineered by Bill Radice and thanks to Tom Coleman

Notes
"It's What You Do with What You Got" was re-worked by the band and turned into the controversial "Niggizz Can't Sang Rock & Roll", found on Mother's Finest self-titled 1976 debut album for Epic Records.

References

External links 
 Discogs page
 Wounded Bird page
 Amazon page

Mother's Finest albums
1972 debut albums
RCA Records albums